The orange-bellied trogon (Trogon collaris aurantiiventris) is a subspecies of the collared trogon in the family Trogonidae. It is now usually considered as a morph of the collared trogon, but was previously sometimes treated as a separate species. It is found in the Talamancan montane forests of Costa Rica and Panama.

Description 
The back, head and breast of the male are green, and a white line separates the breast from the orange underparts. The undertail is white with black barring, and the wings are black, vermiculated with white. The female has a brown back, head and breast, a relatively uniform undertail (not clearly barred), and underparts that are slightly paler than in the male. It is distinguished from the collared trogon by belly colour alone.

Habitat 
Its natural habitats are subtropical or tropical moist montane forests and heavily degraded former forest.

References

External links

 
 
 

orange-bellied trogon
Birds of the Talamancan montane forests
orange-bellied trogon
Taxonomy articles created by Polbot